Paula Herts  (born ) is a Brazilian Paralympic sitting volleyball player. She is part of the Brazil women's national sitting volleyball team.

She competed at the 2012 Summer Paralympics finishing 5th, 2015 Parapan American Games, and 2016 Summer Paralympics.

On club level she played for Add in 2012.

See also
 Brazil at the 2012 Summer Paralympics
 Brazil at the 2016 Summer Paralympics

References

External links

1974 births
Living people
Volleyball players at the 2012 Summer Paralympics
Paralympic volleyball players of Brazil
Brazilian women's sitting volleyball players
Medalists at the 2016 Summer Paralympics
Paralympic medalists in volleyball
Paralympic bronze medalists for Brazil
21st-century Brazilian women